Esther Fussell Byrnes (1867–1946) was an American biologist and science teacher. She was one of the first women copepodologists—scientists who study copepods. She was a fellow of the New York Academy of Sciences, as well as the American Society of Naturalists.

Life
Byrnes was born in Overbrook, Philadelphia in 1867. She graduated from Bryn Mawr College with a B.A. in 1891. For the next two years she worked in the biology department at Vassar College as an assistant. She then returned to Bryn Mawr College and obtained a master's degree in 1894, followed by a doctorate in 1898, whilst working in the college's biology department.

She left and went to teach in New York at the Girls High School, Brooklyn in their Department of Physiology and Biology until her retirement from teaching in 1932. During this time, she was a member of the New York  Science Teachers Association. This was only interrupted from 1926 to 1927, when she took a year off to tutor the princesses of the Japanese royal family at Tsuda College, Tokyo.

In 1940, she became director of Mount Desert Biological Laboratory, Maine.

Her research was focused on marine biology and her work at Bryn Mawr focused on the study of limb regeneration in amphibians as well as studying cyclops, a freshwater species of crustacean.

She died in Maine while on vacation at the age of 79.

Memberships 

 New York State Science Teachers' Association
 North Central Community League of Philadelphia
 Society of Naturalists
 Society of Zoologists
 Marine Biological Association
 Genetic Association

Works

References

1867 births
1946 deaths
Science teachers
American marine biologists
Women marine biologists
American carcinologists
20th-century American women scientists
20th-century American scientists